Kaganovich was a Project 26bis2  of the Soviet Navy that was built during World War II. She was built in Siberia from components shipped from European Russia. She saw no action during the war and served into the Cold War. She was renamed Lazar Kaganovich in 1945 to distinguish her from Lazar's disgraced brother Mikhail Kaganovich. Her post-war career was generally uneventful, although her superstructure was badly damaged by a Force 12 typhoon in 1957. She was renamed Petropavlovsk in 1957. Sources disagree on her fate; some say that she was converted into a floating barracks in 1960 and later sold for scrap while another says that she was simply sold for scrap in 1960.

Description

Kaganovich carried nine  57-caliber B-1-P guns in three electrically powered MK-3-180 triple turrets. The turrets were very small; they were designed to fit into the limited hull space available and were so cramped that their rate of fire was much lower than designed—only two rounds per minute instead of six. The guns were mounted in a single cradle to minimize space and were so close together that their shot dispersion was very high because the muzzle blast from adjacent barrels affected each gun. Unlike her half-sisters built in European Russia, her secondary armament initially consisted of eight single  90-K dual-purpose anti-aircraft guns. Kaganovichs initial light AA armament is unknown, although her sister ship Kalinins initially consisted of six semi-automatic  21-K AA guns with 600 rounds per gun, ten fully automatic  70-K AA guns with a thousand rounds per gun, and six DK  machine guns with 12,500 rounds per gun. During the 1950s her light anti-aircraft armament was replaced by nine powered 37 mm V-11 mounts.

Six  39-Yu torpedo tubes were fitted in two triple mountings, one on each side. She received the Lend-Lease ASDIC-132 sonar system, which the Soviets called Drakon-132, as well as the experimental Soviet Mars-72 system.

Kaganovichs radar suite is unknown, but it is likely she was equipped with a mix of Soviet and British and American Lend-Lease radars. At some point during the 1950s her radars were replaced by modern Soviet-built radars; Gyuys for air search, Rif for surface search, Zalp for main-armament gunnery and Yakor for anti-aircraft gunnery.

Service
Kaganovich was one of the Project 26bis2 cruisers, the third pair of the s. She was larger and had a more powerful anti-aircraft armament than her half-sisters. She was assembled at Shipyard 199, Komsomolsk-on-Amur, from components built at the Shipyard 198 (Marti South) in Nikolayev. She was laid down on 12 August 1938, launched from drydock on 7 May 1944 and was officially accepted into the Pacific Fleet on 6 December 1944 after being towed down the Amur River to Vladivostok. She was still incomplete on this date and the official report of all work completed was not signed until 29 January 1947. Her construction was prolonged by late deliveries from western factories. For example, her propellers had to be shipped from Leningrad after it had been surrounded by the Germans in September 1941 and her propeller shafts had to be removed from the Barrikady factory in Stalingrad before it was destroyed by the Germans in 1942. Another problem was the collapse of nine girders supporting the roof of Dock 8 onto the ship in early December 1942.

She was renamed Lazar Kaganovich in 1945 to disassociate her from Lazar's disgraced brother Mikhail Kaganovich. She remained inactive during the Soviet invasion of Manchuria in 1945. She spent the post-war period on routine training missions. She was renamed Petropavlovsk on 3 August 1957 after Lazar Kaganovich was purged from the government after an unsuccessful coup against Nikita Khrushchev that same year. Her superstructure was badly damaged by a Force 12 typhoon on 19 September 1957. Sources disagree on her fate; one says that she was converted into a floating barracks on 6 February 1960 and later sold for scrap while another says that she was simply sold for scrap on 6 February 1960.

Notes

References

Further reading

External links
  Project 26 history 
  Kaganovich on navsource.narod.ru

Kirov-class cruisers
Ships built in the Soviet Union
1944 ships
World War II cruisers of the Soviet Union
Cold War cruisers of the Soviet Union
Maritime incidents in 1958